Teinoptila bolidias is a moth of the  family Yponomeutidae. It is found in China (Gansu, Hubei, Hunan, Shaanxi, Yunnan, Zhejiang) and Thailand.

The wingspan is 21–27 mm

External links
Taxonomic study of the genus Teinoptila Sauber, 1902 from China (Lepidoptera: Yponomeutidae)

Yponomeutidae